Nogometni klub Zvijezda Gradačac (English: Football Club Zvijezda Gradačac), or commonly referred to as just Zvijezda is a football club from Bosnia and Herzegovina, based in the city of Gradačac. Zvijezda host their home matches at the Banja Ilidža Stadium, which has a capacity of 5,000 seats. They currently play in the First League of the Federation of Bosnia and Herzegovina, the country's second level.

History
The club was founded in 1922 as NK Vardar. After World War II the club was renamed Zvijezda. Until 1992 and the breakup of Yugoslavia, Zvijezda competed in various lower-tier zonal and regional leagues of the Yugoslav league system.

Honours

Domestic

League
First League of the Federation of Bosnia and Herzegovina:
Winners (1): 2007–08
Runners-up (1): 2015–16

Managerial history

 Ratko Ninković (2007–2009)
 Amir Durgutović (2009)
 Zoran Ćurguz (2009–2010)
 Dragan Jović (2010–2012)
 Zoran Kuntić (2012)
 Milomir Odović (2012–2013)
 Vladimir Gaćinović (2013)
 Nermin Huseinbašić (2013)
 Denis Taletović (2013–2014)
 Emir Tufek (2014)
 Nermin Huseinbašić (2014)
 Petar Šegrt (2014–2015)
 Nedim Jusufbegović (2015–2016)
 Darko Vojvodić (2016–2017)
 Bojan Magazin (2017)
 Nermin Šabić (2017–2018)
 Romeo Šapina (2018)
 Mile Lazarević (2018–2019)
 Senad Hadžić (2019)
 Vlado Jagodić (2019)
 Mile Lazarević (2019–2020)
 Dario Damjanović (2020)
 Mato Neretljak (2020–2021)
 Nebojša Đekanović (2021–present)

External links
 – archived 

 
Association football clubs established in 1922
1922 establishments in Bosnia and Herzegovina
Football clubs in Bosnia and Herzegovina